Country Life Press is one of five stations of the Long Island Rail Road within the village of Garden City, New York. It serves the Hempstead Branch and is located on Damson Street and St. James Street South in Garden City.

History
The station was originally opened in 1911 for the sole purpose of serving the book publisher Doubleday, Page & Company, which had moved in 1910 from Manhattan to Garden City, where co-founder and vice-president Walter Hines Page lived. It is named for the publisher's "Country Life Press" that was located across the tracks. Country Life Press station has some former rights-of-way that led to the West Hempstead and the Oyster Bay Branches. It also included the remnants of the Central Branch of the Long Island Rail Road that terminated near Nassau Coliseum.

In 2022, the Long Island Rail Road announced plans to demolish the station house, which had fallen into a state of disrepair, and replacing it with a landscaped plaza. That December, the Village of Garden City's officials, through a 7-1 vote, opted through resolution not to attempt saving the structure, given safety concerns (many of which were raised by members of the community) and the poor state of the structure.

Station layout
The station has one 10-car-long side platform on the east side of the single track.

Image gallery

References

External links
 

Country Life Press Station History (Arrt's Arrchives)
St. James Street entrance from Google Maps Street View
Digitzed copies of books on the Country Life Press and books published by the facility at Internet Archive
GARDEN Interlocking (The LIRR Today)
Platform from Google Maps Street View

Garden City, New York
Long Island Rail Road stations in Nassau County, New York
Railway stations in the United States opened in 1911